Joseph Francis Genet (2 June 1914 – 1 September 1999) was a New Zealand wrestler who won a bronze medal representing his country at the 1938 British Empire Games.

Biography
Born on 2 June 1914, Genet was the son of Frances Genet (née Bradshaw) and her husband Alexander Genet.

At the 1938 British Empire Games in Sydney, he won the bronze medal in the men's featherweight (62 kg) division.

During World War II, Genet served with the 2nd New Zealand Expeditionary Force, reaching the rank of corporal. Before and after the war, he worked as a clothing presser.

Genet died on 1 September 1999, and was buried at Temuka Cemetery.

References

1914 births
1999 deaths
Commonwealth Games bronze medallists for New Zealand
Wrestlers at the 1938 British Empire Games
New Zealand male sport wrestlers
Commonwealth Games medallists in wrestling
New Zealand military personnel of World War II
Burials at Temuka Cemetery
Medallists at the 1938 British Empire Games